Duke Frederick William Nicholas of Mecklenburg-Schwerin (5 March 1827 – 28 July 1879) was the second son of Paul Frederick, Grand Duke of Mecklenburg-Schwerin, and his wife Princess Alexandrine, daughter of King Frederick William III of Prussia.

Life
He enlisted in the Prussian Army and became commander of the 6th (Brandenburg) Cuirassiers "Emperor Nicholas I of Russia". William had a reputation for drunkenness and a dissolute character. On two occasions he was deprived of his command in the Prussian army and he proposed marriage to the celebrated ballerina Marie Taglioni; consequently he was generally considered to be the "black sheep" of the family. Under family pressure, on 9 December 1865, he married Alexandrine of Prussia, daughter of his uncle Albert of Prussia and Marianne of Orange-Nassau. William settled with his wife at Bellevue Palace in Berlin. The marriage was unhappy and the couple had an only child: Charlotte (1868-1944) who married Prince Heinrich XVIII Reuss of Köstritz.

William took part in the Austro-Prussian War of 1866 as a major general in command of a cavalry brigade in the First Army. He managed, with difficulty, to secure a command in the Prussian Army during the Franco-Prussian War, leading the 6th Cavalry Division, but he was wounded on 9 September 1870 in Laon. As a result, he was long absent from the front and he showed a great lack of energy at the Battle of Le Mans. In 1873 he became commander of the 22nd Division in Kassel, completed in 1874 but it was only an honorary position. He died on 28 July 1879.

Honours
He received the following orders and decorations:

Ancestors

Notes

1827 births
1879 deaths
People from Schwerin
William
William
Generals of Cavalry (Prussia)
Prussian people of the Austro-Prussian War
German military personnel of the Franco-Prussian War
Recipients of the Order of the White Eagle (Russia)
Recipients of the Order of St. Anna, 1st class
Recipients of the Pour le Mérite (military class)
Recipients of the Iron Cross (1870), 1st class
Burials at Schwerin Cathedral
Sons of monarchs
Military personnel from Mecklenburg-Western Pomerania